The National Football Championship is a semi-professional association football tournament in Bangladesh, contested by districts and government institutions of the country. During the seasons ranging from 2000 to 2006, the wide-open national cup tournament was played by the champions from different districts (Chittagong, Rajshahi, Barishal and Syhlet) along with the top three teams of each season from the country's top division at the time, the Dhaka Premier Division League. In 2006, the Championship was shut down along with the Dhaka Premier Division League (formerly the Dhaka League), after the introduction of the Bangladesh Premier League. In 2020, the tournament was rebranded with a new format and resumed after 13 years. The tournament is hosted and organized by the Bangladesh Football Federation.

History

(2000–2006) 
In 2000, the Bangladesh Football Federation established the National Football Championship (NFC), which was played alongside the country's top-tier at the time, the Dhaka Premier Division League (formerly Dhaka League). The championship was introduced  in order for different district champions to get a better platform, as the top division league only featured clubs from Dhaka

The tournament, included the top 3 finishing teams from the Dhaka Premier league season, along with district league champions of Chittagong, Rajshahi, and the winners of a playoff between the champions of Sylhet and Barisal. From 2005 to 2007, the Dhaka Premier Division League was not held, which meant the National Football Championship was the only functioning competition which had the country's top clubs participate, other than the domestic club competitions. 

In 2007, the Bangladesh Premier League replaced the Dhaka Premier Division League as the country's top-tier. This marked the beginning of the country's first professional football league, and also the first wide open national league, meaning a National Football Championship was no longer required.

Reintroduction (2020–present) 
On 10 January 2020, the Bangladesh Football Federation revived the National Football Championship after a gap of 13 years, celebrating the 100th birth anniversary of  Bangabandhu Sheikh Mujibur Rahman. The reintroduced National Championship will not include football clubs, instead district football teams will be allowed to participate in the competition. The participating teams are divided equally into eight zones, with each team playing matches on a home-and-away basis. The winners will progress to the next round while the losers will play plate-phase matches. In the end, eight zonal champions will play the final round.

Sponsorship 
Nitol-Tata Group was the title sponsor of this competition from 2001 to 2005. For sponsorship reason, the competition was also known as Nitol-Tata National Football League.

Winners

2000–2006
All clubs are listed have won the league from 2000 until 2006 when top-tier teams participated:

2020–Present 
All clubs are listed have won the league after the it was reintroduced in 2020.

Statistics by club

References

 
Football cup competitions in Bangladesh